Henry Ford House may refer to:

Henry Ford House, a house in the Boston-Edison Historic District in Detroit, Michigan
Henry Ford Birthplace, a house in the Greenfield Village in Dearborn, Michigan
Henry Ford Square House, a house in Garden City, Michigan
Fair Lane, Henry Ford's estate in Dearborn, Michigan
Henry Ford Estate, part of the Edison and Ford Winter Estates in Fort Myers, Florida